Derbesiaceae are a family of green algae in the order Bryopsidales.

References

External links

Ulvophyceae families
Bryopsidales